Aedes (Aedimorphus) taeniorhynchoides is a species complex of zoophilic mosquito belonging to the genus Aedes. It is found in Sri Lanka.

References

External links

taeniorhynchoides
Insects described in 1911